Abdelrahim Lahbibi (born 1950) is a Moroccan novelist.

Early life
He was born in Safi and attended university in Fez. He studied Arabic at the College of Arts and Human Sciences, graduating with a BA in 1970.

Career
He has worked as a teacher and educationist ever since. His novel The Journeys of 'Abdi, known as Son of Hamriya was shortlisted for the 2013 Arabic Booker Prize.

Novels
 Bread, Hashish and Fish (2008)
 The Best of Luck (2010)
 The Journeys of 'Abdi, known as Son of Hamriya (2013)

References

 

Moroccan novelists
Moroccan male writers
Male novelists
1950 births
People from Safi, Morocco
Living people
Moroccan educators